Honfleur is a commune in the Calvados department in northwestern France. It is located on the southern bank of the estuary of the Seine across from le Havre and very close to the exit of the Pont de Normandie. The people that inhabit Honfleur are called Honfleurais.

It is especially known for its old port, characterized by its houses with slate-covered frontages, painted frequently by artists. There have been many notable artists, including, Gustave Courbet, Eugène Boudin, Claude Monet and Johan Jongkind, forming the école de Honfleur (Honfleur school) which contributed to the appearance of the Impressionist movement. The Sainte-Catherine church, which has a bell tower separate from the principal building, is the largest wooden church in France.

History

The first written record of Honfleur is a reference by Richard III, Duke of Normandy, in 1027. By the middle of the 12th century, the city represented a significant transit point for goods from Rouen to England.

Located on the estuary of one of the principal rivers of France with a safe harbour and relatively rich hinterland, Honfleur profited from its strategic position from the start of the Hundred Years' War. The town's defences were strengthened by Charles V in order to protect the estuary of the Seine from attacks by the English. This was supported by the nearby port of Harfleur. However, Honfleur was taken and occupied by the English in 1357 and from 1419 to 1450. When under French control, raiding parties often set out from the port to ransack the English coasts, including partially destroying the town of Sandwich, in Kent, England, in the 1450s.

At the end of the Hundred Years' War Honfleur benefited from the boom in maritime trade until the end of the 18th century. Trade was disturbed during the wars of religion in the 16th century. The port saw the departure of a number of explorers, in particular in 1503 of Binot Paulmierde Gonneville to the coasts of Brazil. In 1506, local man Jean Denis departed for Newfoundland island and the mouth of the Saint Lawrence. An expedition in 1608, organised by Samuel de Champlain, founded the city of Quebec in modern-day Canada.

After 1608 Honfleur thrived on trade with Canada, the West Indies, the African coasts and the Azores. As a result, the town became one of the five principal ports for the slave trade in France. During this time the rapid growth of the town saw the demolition of its fortifications on the orders of Colbert.

The wars of the French revolution and the First Empire, and in particular the continental blockade, caused the ruin of Honfleur. It only partially recovered during the 19th century with the trading of wood from northern Europe. Trade was however limited by the silting up of the entrance to the port and development of the modern port at Le Havre. The port however still functions today.

Honfleur was liberated together by the British army – 19th Platoon of the 12th Devon's, 6th Air Landing Brigade, the Belgian army (Brigade Piron) on 25 August 1944 and the Canadian army without any combat.

Toponymy
Mentioned as Hunefleth in 1025; Hunefloth around 1062; Honneflo in 1198; Honflue in 1246; Honnefleu, up to the 18th century.

Traditional pronunciation: [χõ'fjø] with the h strongly aspirated, like in 'loch'. It is lost nowadays.

The marker -fleur, formerly -fleu which is widespread in Normandy (Cf. Barfleur, Vittefleur, Harfleur, Crémanfleur, Fiquefleur and La Gerfleur stream), which means 'stream, river running into the sea', was still in use in the 13th century as written in a document le fleu de Lestre, meaning the Lestre river.

It could come from a word of Old Norse origin flóð, compare Old English flōd (> flood), which means 'estuary', 'branch of the sea', combined with flói 'river running into the sea' for the meaning. But according to the numerous old mentions of Barfleur (-flueth 1066 – 77, -floth 1081 – 87, -fluet 12th century, -flet 1200), it is more probably the OE flēot 'run of water', that can be found in the English place-names in -fleet, such as Adingfleet, Marfleet, Ousefleet, combined very often with a male's name.

The element Hon- seems to come from an Anglo-Saxon given name Huna or the Norse Húni, variant form Húnn, which is also found close to Honfleur in Honnaville, homonym of the Honneville at Saint-Georges-du-Mesnil. Such a connection between two close place-names can be noted regularly in the Norman toponymy. They are, in any case, close places : Crémanfleur / Crémanville; Barfleur (former Barbefleu) / Barbeville, etc. The -ville element is almost always combined with a personal name.

The similarity with the name of Bay of Húnaflói in Iceland is likely a coincidence.

Geography
Honfleur is in the Norman département of Calvados, located on the southern bank of the estuary of the Seine, across from Le Havre and very close to the exit of the Pont de Normandie. The town is at the eastern extremity of the  coastline called the Côte Fleurie (Flowery Coast).

Like most of northern France, Honfleur has an oceanic climate with warm summers, cool winters, rain all year round and few extremes of temperature.

Population

The population has hovered between 7,400 and 10,000 since 1793. , Honfleur had 7,425 inhabitants, who are called Honfleurais.

Administration
Honfleur is the seat of a canton including the communes of Ablon, Barneville-la-Bertran, Cricquebœuf, Équemauville, Fourneville, Genneville, Gonneville-sur-Honfleur, Honfleur, Pennedepie, Quetteville, La Rivière-Saint-Sauveur, Saint-Gatien-des-Bois, and Le Theil-en-Auge.

These 13 communes also form the intercommunality of Pays de Honfleur.

In 1973 Honfleur merged with the commune of Vasouy (143 inhabitants in 1999). The INSEE code used to be 14725.

Sights

Saint-Catherine's Church
The church is dedicated to Saint Catherine of Alexandria as evidenced by a wooden sculpture above the porch of the bell tower which separates the two naves.  She is shown holding a wheel and a sword.  The first nave is the oldest part of the building, dating to the second half of the 15th century, constructed right after the Hundred Years' War. It was built on the model of a market hall, using naval construction techniques, which gives the impression of an upside-down ship's hull.  Then the bell tower was built a good distance away, so that parishioners would not be burnt in case of a fire.  Indeed, the bell tower did draw lightning strikes due to its height and its position on the side of a hill.  In the 16th century, a second nave was added, whose vault was like the wooden vaults of modest Gothic churches.  This second part was more round, and did not look like a ship's hull.  Later, supplementary bays were added to both naves.

The famous "Axe masters" of the naval yards of the city created this lovely building without using any saws, just like their Norman ancestors (who can be seen in action in the Bayeux Tapestry), and like the Vikings before them.

The beams used to create the pillars of the nave and the side walls are of unequal length, because there were no oak trees long enough to construct them uniformly. Some beams have a footing of stones varying in height, and some have no footing.

The bays for the choir, redone in the 19th century, are of rather mediocre quality, and the roof above is higher than those of the older parts.

The church is partially covered in chestnut shingles, which are called "essentes" in the local dialect.

The neo-Norman porch was built following the model of rural Normandy churches at the beginning of the 20th century, and replaced a monumental doorway in neo-classical style from the previous century (which can be seen in certain canvases by Jongkind and Boudin).  The doorway itself was in Renaissance style.

It is worth noting that the classical organ comes from the parish church of St Vincent of Rouen, and the Renaissance balcony is decorated with musicians.  Stained glass from the 19th century decorates the windows of the east choir.

The building lacks a transept; the lateral walls of the chapels are uniquely adorned by statues of recent saints, including two local ones:  Saint Marcouf et Saint Thérèse of Lisieux. There is also a painting depicting the Martyrdom of Saint Denis of the Nativity.

Others
 Église Saint-Étienne (St. Stephen's Church). An old parish church in Gothic style, dating in part to the 14th and 15th centuries.  It is the oldest in the city.  It is constructed of chalk with flint and of Caen stone, the city of Honfleur being located at the border of those two calcareous rock formations. The bell tower is covered with a façade essentage of chestnut wood.  Today, it has become the Naval Museum.
 Église Saint-Léonard (St. Leonard's Church), with a flamboyant Gothic style façade; the rest of the building was rebuilt in the 17th and 18th centuries, which explains the unusual form of the bell tower which forms a sort of a dome.
The interior is entirely painted in murals, including the visible wooden vaulting.
 Salt barns. Two barns remain out of three originals, one having been destroyed by fire.  These two buildings contained  of salt for preserving the catch of this important fishing port.  They were constructed in the 17th century, after the citizens received permission from Colbert. The bulk of the salt came from Brouage.  The walls were constructed with great blocks of chalky limestone and wooden vaulting, which, being constructed by naval carpenters, evoke the hulls of vessels of the 17th century.
 Chapelle de Grâce  (Grace Chapel). This building was reconstructed after the cliff collapsed. On the exterior, one can see pilgrimage bells.
 Le cotre Sainte-Bernadette, the last crayfishing sloop which is still in shape to sail.  It belongs to the La chaloupe d'Honfleur (Honfleur Sloop) association. It was enrolled as a historic monument of France (monuments historiques) as of 18 October 1983.
 The commune was rated 4 flowers (of 4) in the Concours des villes et villages fleuris.
La Forge. La Forge is the house of Florence Marie, who was an artist. It also contains a garden and much art. There are different types of art including paintings, sculptures, and mosaïques. Marie's artistic eye is shown through the decorations on display at his house.

Notable people

 Alphonse Allais (1854–1905), writer and humourist
 Louis Andlauer (1876–1915), organist and composer
 Eugène Boudin (1824–1898), landscape painter.
 Marcel Caens (1919–2006), classical trumpeter
 Denis of the Nativity (1600–1638), (né Pierre Berthelot), Catholic martyr
 Michel Danino (born 1956), author
 Jean Dries (1905-1973), painter and curator of the Museum Eugène Boudin
 Hugues Gall (born 1940), opera manager
 Jacques Félix Emmanuel Hamelin (1768–1839), rear admiral
 Sophie Mallebranche (born 1976), textile designer
 Christopher Rocancourt (born 1967), impostor and con artist
 Erik Satie (1866–1925), composer and musician
 Albert Sorel (1842–1906), a French historian.
 Pascal Lecocq (born 1958), fine art surrealist painter, workshop and gallery from 1988 to 2000.
 Félix Vallotton (1865–1925), painter with studio in Honfleur

Twin towns – sister cities

Honfleur is twinned with:
 Burlington, United States
 Plyos, Russia
 Sandwich, England, United Kingdom
 Visé, Belgium
 Wörth am Main, Germany

See also
 Port of Honfleur
Communes of the Calvados department

References

External links

 Official City Website 
 Tourist Office / Convention Bureau 
 Honfleur Phonebook
 Photos of Honfleur
 Photos from Honfleur
 A puzzle of disappearing grandeur in Honfleur, can you help? Personal blog.
 The shocking life story of Christophe Rocancourt, son of Honfleur, conman to the world – with pics

Communes of Calvados (department)
Populated coastal places in France